The San Pedro Cutud Lenten Rites is a Holy Week re-enactment of Christ's Passion and Death which takes place in Barangay San Pedro Cutud, City of San Fernando, Pampanga in the Philippines.

It includes a passion play culminating with the actual nailing of at least three penitents to a wooden cross atop the makeshift Calvary.

Events 
Every year on Good Friday or  the Friday before Easter a dozen or so penitents - mostly men but with the occasional woman - are taken to a rice field in the barrio of San Pedro Cutud, 3 km (2 miles) from the proper of City of San Fernando, Pampanga and nailed to a cross using two-inch (5 cm) stainless steel nails that have been soaked in alcohol to disinfect them. The penitents are taken down when they feel cleansed of their sin. Other penitents flagellate themselves using bamboo sticks tied to a rope.

UNESCO Intangible Cultural Heritage
The "Cutud Lenten Rites" has been registered in the Intangible Cultural Heritage Inventory of the Philippines called 'Pinagmulan.' The move was initiated by the National Commission for Culture and the Arts, the main cultural agency of the Republic of the Philippines. The rites may be nominated for inclusion in the UNESCO Intangible Cultural Heritage Lists, where 3 other Philippine intangible heritages have already been inscribed.

See also
San Pedro Cutud
Giant Lantern Festival
City of San Fernando, Pampanga

External links 

Good Friday in San Fernando, Pampanga
Center for Kapampangan Studies - Mal a Aldo documentary
Photo gallery
2015 Photo gallery
Flagellations in Pampanga
Travelguide.com
Travelog Philippines - 2009 Crucifixions in San Fernando, Pampanga

References

Catholic Church in the Philippines
Religion in Pampanga
San Fernando, Pampanga
Holy Week in the Philippines